The Masonic Lodge 570 building is a historic Moderne style building in San Angelo, Texas.  The building was constructed during 1927-31 as a commercial space plus a meeting hall for San Angelo Lodge #570 (a local area Masonic lodge). It was listed on the National Register of Historic Places in 1988.

It is a two-story stuccoed commercial building that is a rare local example of Art Moderne architecture.

See also

National Register of Historic Places listings in Tom Green County, Texas

References

Masonic buildings completed in 1927
Buildings and structures in San Angelo, Texas
Masonic buildings in Texas
Clubhouses on the National Register of Historic Places in Texas
National Register of Historic Places in Tom Green County, Texas